Daphnephila stenocalia is a species of gall midges first associated with leaf galls on Lauraceae species, particularly Machilus thunbergii in Taiwan. Based on analysis on sequences of the mitochondrial cytochrome c oxidase subunit I, it has been suggested that in this genus, the stem-galling habit is a more ancestral state as opposed to the leaf-galling habit. This genus appears to have originated tropically and dispersed to Japan through Taiwan.

References

Further reading

External links 
 
 ADW

Diptera of Asia
Cecidomyiinae